The Station of the Cross is a network of Catholic radio stations owned and operated by Holy Family Communications. It is an affiliate of the EWTN Global Catholic Radio network.

Current stations

Former stations

Notes

External links 
 The Station of the Cross Homepage

American radio networks
Christian mass media companies
Christian radio stations in the United States
Catholic radio stations
Radio stations established in 1999
1999 establishments in the United States